Paul Charles Michaelis was a Bell Labs researcher in magnetic bubble memory.

Education
Michaelis was born June 18, 1935 in NYC, raised in New Jersey on a Scotch Plains farm, went to high School in Scotch Plain, First worked in Bell Labs, Murray Hill, NJ, starting career as a junior draftsman, attended it's drafting school. Subsequently, attended NCE Newark College of Engineering, (now "New Jersey Institute of Technology") Received BSEE, BSME and MS Physics. After several promotions was promoted to Member of Bell Laboratories Technical Staff and subsequently promoted to Technical Manager. NJ.

Career
Michaelis spent 43 years with Bell Labs, primarily in Murray Hill and Whippany.

He primarily dealt with mechanics, magnetics, fiber optics, electrical circuits, device packaging, acoustic surveillance and vibration reduction.  He also worked on underwater surveillance devices and equipment silencing for the United States Navy.

Michaelis was a Guest Lecturer in Magnetics at the Soviet Academy of Sciences USSR in 1972, lecturing at the University of Moscow, University in Tbilisi, Soviet Georgia and the Semiconductor Institute in Leningrad [now St Petersburg].

Michaelis retired from Bell Labs in 1996 as Technical Manager of the Advanced Vibration Reduction Design Group.

Notable awards
Michaelis received the 1975 IEEE Morris N. Liebmann Memorial Award "for the concept and development of single-walled magnetic domains (magnetic bubbles), and for recognition of their importance to memory technology." The single walled concept was the seminal idea that led to "magnetic bubbles" and charge coupled devices.

References
 Bonyhard, P.; Geusic, J.; Bobeck, A.; Yu-Ssu Chen; Michaelis, P.; Smith, J., "Magnetic bubble memory chip design", IEEE Transactions on Magnetics, Volume 9, Issue 3, pages 433–436. September 1973.
 Michaelis, P.; Richards, W., "Magnetic bubble mass memory", IEEE Transactions on Magnetics,  Volume 11, Issue 1, pages 21–25. January 1975.
 Letter from Paul Michaelis, Reader Feedback, Design News, November 13, 2007
 United States Patent 4027298: Magnetic bubble memory bias magnet arrangement
 Paul+Charles+Michaelis United States Patent 4275459: Magnetic Bubble Detector Arrangement
 Paul+Charles+Michaelis United States Patent 3735370: Input for Single-Wall Domain Arrangement
 Paul+Charles+Michaelis United States Patent 4164790: Magnetic Bubble Packaging Arrangement
 Paul+Charles+Michaelis United States Patent 3675298: Micromanipulator for Multilevel Assembly
 Paul+Charles+Michaelis United States Patent 3454939: Magnetic Domain Propagation Device
 Paul+Charles+Michaelis United States Patent 3471819: Thermally Activated Bistable Switch
 Paul+Charles+Michaelis United States Patent 3508222: Readout Implementation for Magnetic Memory
 Paul+Charles+Michaelis United States Patent 3480925: Asynchronous Magnetic Circuit
 Paul+Charles+Michaelis Canadian Patent 2011561: Apparatus and Method for Making Low-loss Permanent Optical Fiber Splices
 Paul+C+Michaelis Canadian Patent 824830: Asynchronous Magnetic Circuit

1935 births
American electrical engineers
New Jersey Institute of Technology alumni
Scientists at Bell Labs
Living people
People from Hanover Township, New Jersey
Engineers from New Jersey